H0m gauge is used to represent metre-gauge trains in H0 scale. It runs on  TT scale tracks. Modern H0m trains run on realistic-looking two-rail track, which is powered by direct current (varying the voltage applied to the rails to change the speed, and polarity to change direction), or by Digital Command Control (sending commands to a decoder in each locomotive). It is a popular scale in Europe, particularly for trains of Swiss outline.

Ready to run models are widely available from companies like Bemo and D+R Modellbahn, a number of companies including, Lemaco and Ferro-suisse, also produced more detailed handmade brass models.

H0m track is also used in Australia to model the narrow-gauge lines in Queensland, South Australia, Tasmania and Western Australia where trains run on 3'6" track. Likewise it has a following in South Africa, Japan and to a small extent Taiwan and New Zealand which also use 3'6" tracks. See HOn3-1/2 scale.

Related scales
In the same scale standard-gauge trains are modelled on  gauge track, known as H0. Narrow-gauge trains are usually modelled on  gauge track which is known as H0e and industrial minimum-gauge lines are modelled on  gauge track known as H0i or H0f gauge.

External links

Manufacturers
Ferro-Suisse
Bemo
D+R
Tillig
Peco
Haskell
Wuiske Promotions
Black Diamond Models
PGC Scale Models

Model Railroads
An H0m Model of the Albula Line in Switzerland

Model railroad scales
Narrow gauge railway modelling